The , also known as , is a submerged rock formation off the coast of Yonaguni, the southernmost of the Ryukyu Islands, in Japan. It lies approximately a hundred kilometres east of Taiwan.

Marine geologist Masaaki Kimura claims that the formations are man-made stepped monoliths. These claims have been described as pseudoarchaeological. Neither the Japanese Agency for Cultural Affairs nor the government of Okinawa Prefecture recognise the features as important cultural artifacts and neither government agency has carried out research or preservation work on the site.

Discovery
The sea off Yonaguni is a popular diving location during the winter months because of its large population of hammerhead sharks. In 1986, while looking for a good place to observe the sharks, Kihachiro Aratake, a director of the Yonaguni-Cho Tourism Association, noticed some singular seabed formations resembling architectural structures. Shortly thereafter, a group of scientists directed by Masaaki Kimura of the University of the Ryūkyūs visited the formations.

The formation has since become a relatively popular attraction for divers despite strong currents. In 1997, Japanese industrialist Yasuo Watanabe sponsored an informal expedition including pseudoarchaeology writers John Anthony West and Graham Hancock, geologist and fringe theorist Robert Schoch, photographer Santha Faiia, a few sport divers and instructors and a film crew for Channel 4 and Discovery Channel. Another notable visitor was freediver Jacques Mayol, who wrote a book on his dives at Yonaguni.

Location and geology
The formations are located below Arakawabana (新川鼻; Yonaguni: Araga-bana) cliff which is the southern tip of Yonaguni island, with its main face oriented south-southeast.

It is composed of medium to very fine sandstones and mudstones of the Lower Miocene Yaeyama Group believed to have been deposited about 20 million years ago. Most of the rocks in the formations are connected to the underlying rock mass (as opposed to being assembled out of freestanding rocks).

Natural formation
Geologist Robert Schoch believes that it is most likely natural. Schoch observed the sandstones that make up the Yonaguni formation to "contain numerous well-defined, parallel bedding planes along which the layers easily separate. The rocks of this group are also criss-crossed by numerous sets of parallel, vertically oriented joints in the rock. These joints are natural, parallel fractures by which the rectangular formations seen in the area likely formed. Yonaguni lies in an earthquake-prone region; such earthquakes tend to fracture the rocks in a regular manner." He also observes that there are similar formations on the northeast coast of Yonaguni. John Anthony West visited the formation with Schoch and agreed that it was a natural formation and that Kimura "had not looked carefully enough at the natural processes at work." Schoch also believes that the "drawings" identified by Kimura are natural scratches on the rocks, and suggests that the "walls" are simply natural horizontal platforms which fell into a vertical position when rock below them eroded, and the alleged roads are simply channels in the rock.

German geologist Wolf Wichmann, who studied the formations in 1999 during an expedition organized by Spiegel TV, and in 2001 by invitation of Graham Hancock, concluded that they could have been formed by natural processes.

At Sanninudai, there are onshore step-like sandstone formations similar to those of the Yonaguni. Robert Schoch, as well as Patrick D. Nunn, Professor of Oceanic Geoscience at the University of the South Pacific, note that the formations are purely natural.

Pseudoarchaeological claims of artificial structures
Kimura first estimated that the formation must be at least 10,000 years old, dating it to a period when it would have been above water, and therefore surmised that the site may be a remnant of the mythical lost continent of Mu. In a report given to the 21st Pacific Science Congress in 2007, he revised this estimate and dated it to 2,000 to 3,000 years ago because the sea level then was close to current levels. He suggested that after construction, tectonic activity caused it to be submerged below sea level. Archaeologist Richard J. Pearson believes this to be unlikely. Kimura believes he can identify a pyramid, castles, roads, monuments and a stadium. He further stated that he believes the structures to be remnants of Yamatai culture.

Supporters of artificial origin, such as Graham Hancock, also argue that while many of the features seen at Yonaguni are also seen in natural sandstone formations throughout the world, the concentration of so many peculiar formations in such a small area is highly unlikely. They also point to the relative absence of loose blocks on the flat areas of the formation, which would be expected if they were formed solely by natural erosion and fracturing. Robert M. Schoch, who believes the formation was formed geologically, has noted that the rocks are swept with strong currents.

See also
 Bimini Road
 Giant's Causeway
 Marine archaeology in the Gulf of Cambay
 Pantelleria Vecchia Bank Megalith
 Unidentified submerged object

References

External links

 

Landforms of Okinawa Prefecture
Tourist attractions in Okinawa Prefecture
Pseudoarchaeology
Rock formations of Japan
Geotopes
Submerged places